The American Journal of Education seeks to bridge and integrate the intellectual, methodological, and substantive diversity of educational scholarship and to encourage a vigorous dialogue between educational scholars and policy makers. It publishes empirical research, from a wide range of traditions, that contribute to the development of knowledge across the broad field of education.

External links 
 

Education journals
University of Chicago Press academic journals
Quarterly journals
English-language journals
Publications established in 1893